Claude-Henri Belgrand de Vaubois (1 October 1748 in Ville-sous-la-Ferté, Aube – 5 November 1839) was a French general during the French Revolutionary Wars and the Napoleonic Wars. He is best known for the surrender of Malta to the British in 1800. On 20 August 1808 he was created Comte de Belgrand de Vaubois.  Later, his name was inscribed on the Arc de Triomphe (Arche Kléber) in Paris.

Early life
Vaubois was born at Clairvaux (now part of Ville-sous-la-Ferté, Aube). In 1765 he was appointed a lieutenant of artillery in the Regiment of Metz. In 1789 he was appointed a Captain Commandant of Artillery. In 1791 he became a lieutenant colonel of volunteers. During service with the Army of the Alps, he was promoted to general of brigade in September 1793 and to general of division in 1796. After transferring to General Napoleon Bonaparte's Army of Italy, he led his troops in the capture of Livorno. Appointed to command a division in the Bassano campaign, he participated in the victory at the Battle of Rovereto on 4 September.

During the Arcola campaign, Vaubois defended Trento with a 10,500-man division. Paul Davidovich's Austrian corps proved to be unexpectedly strong and fell upon Vaubois with 18,000 men. In a series of skirmishes, Vaubois was driven out of Trento and pushed back to Calliano where his command was defeated on 7 November. Bonaparte arrived to stabilize the situation but the French army commander left Vaubois to do the best he could while Bonaparte attacked the main Austrian army at Arcole. The French won the three-day battle of Arcole on 17 November, the same day that Davidovich beat Vaubois again at Rivoli Veronese. The defeat had little consequence, since Bonaparte soon massed against Davidovich and sent his corps fleeing northward. Soon after, Bonaparte gave Vaubois' division to Barthélemy Joubert.

On 24 November 1796, Bonaparte wrote of him, "Vaubois is a brave man. Has the proper qualifications for the commander of a besieged place but not for the commander of a division in a very active army or in a war so vigorously conducted as this." The events of 1798-1800 were to prove he was certainly the right choice to command a besieged place.

Belgrand de Vaubois in Malta 
Today he is most often remembered in Malta, where Napoleon appointed him Commandant en chef des Isles de Malte et du Goze) on 19 June 1798, just seven days after the Knights Hospitaller, rulers of this archipelago from 1530, signed  a surrender on board L’Orient, Napoleon's flagship. Napoleon and his expedition then set sail for Egypt, with the Knight's treasure, worth five million francs in gold and one million in silver plate, on board the flagship. (Nelson's fleet destroyed L’Orient on 1 August at Abū Qīr Bay in the Battle of the Nile; the Knights' treasures are still on the bottom of sea there.)

Napoleon left behind a garrison of 3,053 men, 5 companies of artillery and a medical unit in Malta and Gozo. The French proceeded to institute a number of policies.  They declared the French language to be the official language. Although the French initially tried to win the support of the Catholic Church, they soon came into conflict with the Maltese Church as they instituted French revolutionary reforms. They abolished papal jurisdiction, authorized civil marriage, expelled all priests, regular clergy and nuns who were not native of Malta, and plundered the churches of gold and silver artifacts and paintings. The plundering of their churches outraged the staunchly pious Maltese. Furthermore, French draining of most of the cash of the Monte di Pietà and the Massa frumentaria precipitated an unprecedented financial crisis. On 2 September 1798 the Maltese rose against the French garrison in Notabile (Città Vecchia or Mdina).  Soon both Malta and Gozo were in full rebellion, with the Maltese forming a National Assembly.  They dispatched to a petition to Ferdinand I of the Two Sicilies, their official Suzerain, in Naples, to help them in their struggle against the French occupiers. Though Ferdinand promised much, he did little, having enough of his own troubles to worry much about his loyal Maltese subjects.

Insurrection and the arrival of the British 

Still, on 18 September, a Portuguese squadron of four ships began a blockade of Malta. That blockade - although varying in the number and national composition of the ships - continued until the French surrendered.  Nelson dispatched British forces under the command of Captain Alexander Ball, who arrived on 12 October 1798. The Maltese insurrectionist forces forced the French to withdraw to Valletta and the Three Cities around the Grand Harbour. On 28 October Gozo Island fell as the French commander there surrendered himself and his 217 men to Captain Ball. With General Vaubois's forces besieged in Valletta, Captain Ball's ships continued the blockade. Expecting the imminent French capitulation, Nelson wrote to Ball in January 1799:

... Respecting the situation of Malta with the King of Naples, it is this – he is the legitimate Sovereign of the Island: therefore, I am of opinion his Flag should fly. At the same time, a Neapolitan garrison would betray it to the first man who would bribe him. I am sure the King would have no difficulty in giving his Sovereignty to England; and I have lately, with Sir William Hamilton, got a Note that Malta should never be given to any Power without the consent of England ...<p>P.S. – In case of the Surrender of Malta, I beg you will not do anything which can hurt the feelings of their Majesties. Unite their Flag with England’s, if it cannot, from the disposition of the Islanders, fly alone.

The siege of Valletta 

In February 1799, the Maltese insurgents, having lost hope in an intervention of King Ferdinand, requested that Ball, who had previously landed near the village of Qrendi on the south of the island, preside over the National Assembly. He changed the name of the assembly to that of National Congress and declared himself chief of government. In March, the Congress appealed to King George III to assume sovereignty over Malta, but no answer came from Pitt’s ministry.

The starving French garrison received a little relief at the beginning of February 1799.  The frigate La Boudeuse ran the blockade and entered the Grand Harbour. However, she was the last ship to re-supply Vaubois and his men.

On 1 November 1799 Nelson was off Valletta on board the Foudroyant. Vaubois, who was still hoping for relief from France, summarily rejected a new surrender demand. Vaubois wrote: "Mindful of being worthy of the respect of your country, as you are with our own, we are resolved to defend this fortress to the last."

Nelson ordered Ball to take command of the Maltese forces – about 2,000 Maltese troops along with about 1,500 irregulars, unpaid, ill-equipped and half-starving. A hard pressed King Ferdinand agreed to confirm Ball as Governor of Malta.

The whole Maltese population, running short of essential provisions, was living close to famine so that the siege was turning into a race of which side would starve first. The British and Maltese, together with a Neapolitan contingent of 1,200 men, got some relief in January 1800.

However, General Vaubois waited in vain for supplies. French preparations had dragged on until Napoleon—now Premier Consul—appointed Contre-amiral Jean-Baptiste Perrée to command a relief expedition. The squadron, comprising Le Généreux (one of the two survivors of the Battle of the Nile), three corvettes serving as armed storeships, and one armed storeship, all with some 3,000 men, arms, food and ammunition on board, sailed from Toulon-sur-Mer on 6 February 1800. The expedition ended in disaster. On the morning of 18 February English ships met the French squadron off Lampedusa island. Contre-amiral Perrée was killed at the start of the action and at 1.30 p.m. Le Généreux struck her colours. The rest of the French convoy returned to Toulon.

On 24 August Vaubois dispatched the frigates La Diane and La Justice to run the blockade to France. The Success sighted them, with the Northumberland and the captured Le Généreux, now crewed by the British, giving chase. The British captured La Diane but La Justice escaped under cover of darkness.

Vaubois' surrender 

The siege was nearing its end. The French garrison had eaten all the horses, the mules, the dogs, the cats and the rats of Valletta. Finally, on 4 September 1800, Vaubois sent an emissary under a flag of truce to the British commander Major-General Henry Pigot. The following day, Pigot and Captain George Martin, RN, negotiated terms of surrender with General Vaubois and Contre-amiral Villeneuve. (Ironically the French excluded Captain Alexander Ball, as chief of the Maltese, from the negotiations, as the French did not want to surrender to the Maltese.) The British granted Vaubois and the French fair terms and the honours of war, including the right to keep their arms and spoils. Vaubois and his troops were quickly repatriated to Marseilles.

After Malta

While the siege continued, Vaubois became a senator on 27 July 1800. He was named a Grand Officer of the Legion of Honour in 1804 and a Count of the Empire in 1808. In 1809 he led a division of the National Guard. He became a peer of France and Knight of St. Louis in 1814. During the Hundred Days in 1815, Vaubois did not join Napoleon. He died in 1839.

Sources
 Chandler, David. Dictionary of the Napoleonic Wars. New York: Macmillan, 1979. 
 
 Annuaire de la noblesse de France et des maisons souveraines de l'Europe. Paris.

References

External links
somewhat contesting Napoleon's willingness to help Vaubois in Malta
mostly about Nelson and also Alexander Ball. But their adversaries feature there too
French Wikipedia

1748 births
1839 deaths
People from Aube
Counts of the First French Empire
Members of the Sénat conservateur
Members of the Chamber of Peers of the Bourbon Restoration
Members of the Chamber of Peers of the July Monarchy
Governors and Governors-General of Malta
Politicians from Grand Est
French generals
Military leaders of the French Revolutionary Wars
French commanders of the Napoleonic Wars
French occupation of Malta
Names inscribed under the Arc de Triomphe